George Lancelot "Dusty" Tapscott (7 November 1889 – 13 December 1940) was a South African cricketer who played in one Test match in 1913. His brother, Lionel, also played Test cricket for South Africa and his sister Billie was a tennis player who reached the quarterfinals at the French Championships and Wimbledon.

References

1889 births
1940 deaths
People from Dikgatlong Local Municipality
Cape Colony people
South Africa Test cricketers
South African cricketers
Griqualand West cricketers